Mahmudabad (also Romanized as Maḩmūdābād) is a village in Salehan Rural District, in the Central District of Khomeyn County, Markazi Province, Iran. At the 2006 census, its population was 27, in 6 families.

References 

Populated places in Khomeyn County